The 2014–15 season was Queen of the South's second consecutive season in the second tier of Scottish football and their second season in the Scottish Championship, having been promoted as champions from the Scottish Second Division at the end of the 2012–13 season. Queens also competed in the Challenge Cup, League Cup and the Scottish Cup.

Summary

Queen of the South finished fourth in the Scottish Championship. Their league position qualified the club for the quarter final stage of the Scottish Premiership play-offs where they were defeated 3-2 on aggregate by Rangers over two legs.

The club reached the first round of the Challenge Cup, the second round of the League Cup and the sixth round of the Scottish Cup.

Management
The club began the 2014-15 season under the management of Jim McIntyre. On 9 September 2014, McIntyre and first team coach Billy Dodds left to become the new manager and assistant of Scottish Premiership side Ross County. On 30 September 2014 James Fowler was announced as the club's new player-manager. On 30 March 2015 Fowler agreed a contract extension until 31 May 2016.

Results & fixtures

Pre season

Scottish Championship

Premiership play-offs

Scottish Challenge Cup

Scottish League Cup

Scottish Cup

Player statistics

Captains

Squad 
Last updated 26 May 2015

 

 

|}
a.  Includes other competitive competitions, including the play-offs and the Challenge Cup.

Disciplinary record
Includes all competitive matches.
Last updated 26 May 2015

Clean sheets
{| class="wikitable" style="font-size: 95%; text-align: center;"
|-
!width=15|
!width=15|
!width=15|
!width=150|Name
!width=80|Scottish Championship
!width=80|Other
!width=80|League Cup
!width=80|Scottish Cup
!width=80|Total
|-
|1
|GK
|
|Zander Clark
|14
|0
|1
|0
|15
|-
|20
|GK
|
|James Atkinson
|0
|0
|0
|1
|1
|-
|31
|GK
|
|Kenny Arthur
|0
|0
|0
|0
|0
|-
|
|
|
! Totals !! 14 !! 0 !! 1 !! 1 !! 16

Top Scorers 
Last updated on 26 May 2015

Team statistics

League table

Division summary

Transfers

Players in

Players out

See also
List of Queen of the South F.C. seasons

References

2014–15
Queen of the South